This is about the book by Muhammad 'Abduh. For other uses, see Comments on the Peak of Eloquence (Ibn Abu al-Hadid). Or see the original Nahj al-Balagha.

Sharh Nahj al-Balagha is Sheikh Muhammad 'Abduh's commentary on Sharif Razi's anthology Nahj al-Balagha—Peak of Eloquence—a collection of sayings attributed to Ali.

Overview
Sheikh Muhammad 'Abduh (1849 – 11 July 1905), the Islamic reformer and former mufti of Egypt, edited and published the Peak of Eloquence (Arabic: Nahj al-Balagha) with a brief commentary, introducing the book first time introduced this book to the Egyptians.

He said that he had no knowledge of Peak of Eloquence until he undertook its study far from home in a distant land. It is said that he was struck with wonder and felt as if he had discovered a precious treasure trove. Thereupon, he immediately decided to publish it and introduce it to the Egyptian public.

References

External links
http://www.al-islam.org/al-tawhid/glimpses/1.htm
http://www.al-islam.org/guided/8.html

Egyptian non-fiction literature
Sunni hadith collections